Michael Smolik (born 28 July 1991) is a German mixed martial artist and former kickboxer. Until 2019, he was multiple amateur world champion and professional world champion in kickboxing in the World Kickboxing and Karate Union. On 30 August 2020, Smolik announced his official end of career in kickboxing via his YouTube channel. He also announced that he had signed a contract with the largest MMA organisation in Germany, the GMC.

Career 
Smolik is of Polish descent. His father Jan Smolik was considered to be one of the best Taekwondo fighters in Poland.

Michael Smolik was trained by his father together with his brother at the age of three. From the age of five, he started training in Taekwondo. After switching to kickboxing, he won his first world title as an amateur at the World Kickboxing and Karate Union in Orlando in 2012. After further World Cup victories as an amateur in light contact, full contact and K-1 rules, he won his first professional fight in September 2014 after just a few seconds by knockout.

Since the beginning of 2015, Smolik has been trained by Pavlica Steko and Mladen Steko in Munich. Since his employer did not approve kickboxing as a side job because of the risk of injury, Smolik gave up his job as a police officer on 1 March 2016. On the nights of 10 and 11 September 2016, he won his first super-heavyweight world title among professionals by knocking out Luca Panto in the first round. Because of his knockout victories usually after a few seconds and his offensive fighting style, Smolik bears the fighting names Flying Badboy and The Knockout Machine. In his fight on July 1, 2017 in the Munich Zenith Hall, he needed three seconds for his knockout victory after the fight began. In addition to his work as a fighter, Smolik trains young talents and is involved in social projects. He also worked on the television series Die Ruhrpottwache.

On 4 May 2019, it was announced that Michael Smolik had signed a contract with one of the largest kickboxing organisations, Glory. At the same time, he parted ways with his previous trainer and manager Mladen Steko. On 12 October 2019, Michael Smolik fought against Mohamed Abdallah at Glory 69 in Düsseldorf, he won this fight on points.

On 27 November 2021, Smolik is expected to fight Alexander Wesner at GMC 26.

Music
Smolik released his debut single "Deine Chance" in December 2019, quickly followed by "Au Revoir" with Bianca Jenny in August 2020, and "Kämpfer" and "Miss Rollercoaster ft. Moné Blak" in 2021 under Suburb Studio.

Social media
Smolik started his YouTube channel on 25 August 25 2015, and has since amassed over 780,000 subscribers and 146,543,481 views as of 4 October 2021.

Bibliography

References

External links 

 
 Team Smolik website

1991 births
Living people
Kickboxers
German male mixed martial artists
German male kickboxers
Glory kickboxers
German male taekwondo practitioners
Heavyweight mixed martial artists
Light heavyweight mixed martial artists
Super heavyweight mixed martial artists
Mixed martial artists utilizing kickboxing
Mixed martial artists utilizing taekwondo